Carl Espen Thorbjørnsen (born 15 July 1982), better known as simply Carl Espen, is a Norwegian singer and songwriter, who represented Norway in the Eurovision Song Contest 2014. He performed his song "Silent Storm".

Music career

2014–present: Eurovision Song Contest

On 9 March 2014, he performed his song "Silent Storm" on the third semi-final during the national selection Melodi Grand Prix 2014, proceeding to the final. The final took place on 15 March 2014 at the Oslo Spektrum in Oslo, he progressed to the Superfinal where he was chosen to represent Norway at the Eurovision Song Contest 2014. He performed during the Second Semi-final on 8 May 2014 and made it to the final. In the final Espen placed 8th.

Discography

Singles

References

Sources

External links
Official website

1982 births
Living people
Musicians from Bergen
Melodi Grand Prix winners
Eurovision Song Contest entrants of 2014
Eurovision Song Contest entrants for Norway
English-language singers from Norway
Norwegian singer-songwriters
Melodi Grand Prix contestants
Articles containing video clips
21st-century Norwegian singers
21st-century Norwegian male singers